Christoph Thiele (born 1968 in Bielefeld) is a German mathematician working in the field of harmonic analysis. After completing his undergraduate studies at TU Darmstadt and Bielefeld University, his Ph.D. was obtained in 1995 at Yale under the supervision of Ronald Coifman. After spending time at UCLA where he was promoted to full professor, he  occupies the Hausdorff Chair at the University of Bonn.

He is famous for work (joint with Michael Lacey) on the bilinear Hilbert transform and for giving a simplified proof of Carleson's theorem; the techniques in this proof have deeply influenced the field of time–frequency analysis. He was a recipient of the 1996 Salem Prize, an invited speaker at the 2002 International Congress of Mathematicians and is a Fellow of the American Mathematical Society.

Selected publications

References

1968 births
Living people
Technische Universität Darmstadt alumni
Bielefeld University alumni
Scientists from Bielefeld
21st-century German mathematicians
20th-century German mathematicians
German expatriates in the United States
University of California, Los Angeles faculty
Academic staff of the University of Bonn
Fellows of the American Mathematical Society
Yale University alumni